Aprilia Yuswandari (born 24 April 1988) is a badminton player from Indonesia. She was part of the Indonesia junior team that won the bronze medal at the 2006 Asian Junior Championships. Yuswandari who trained at the Pusdiklat Semen Gresik selected to join the national team in 2006. In 2010, she joined the Asian Games squad that won the women's team bronze after defeated by the Thai team in the semifinal.

Achievements

ASEAN University Games 
Women's singles

BWF Grand Prix (1 runner-up) 
The BWF Grand Prix had two levels, the Grand Prix and Grand Prix Gold. It was a series of badminton tournaments sanctioned by the Badminton World Federation (BWF) and played between 2007 and 2017.

Women's singles

  BWF Grand Prix Gold tournament
  BWF Grand Prix tournament

BWF International Challenge/Series (1 title, 2 runners-up) 
Women's singles

  BWF International Challenge tournament
  BWF International Series tournament

BWF Junior International (1 title, 1 runner-up) 
Girls' singles

  BWF Junior International Grand Prix tournament
  BWF Junior International Challenge tournament
  BWF Junior International Series tournament
  BWF Junior Future Series tournament

Performance timeline

National team 
 Junior level

 Senior level

Individual competitions 
 Senior level

Record against selected opponents 
Includes results against Olympic quarterfinals, Worlds semifinalists, and Super Series finalists.

  Petya Nedelcheva 0–1
  Wang Lin 0–1
  Wang Xin 0–1
  Wang Yihan 0–1
  Xie Xingfang 0–1
  Zhu Jingjing 0–1
  Li Xuerui 0–1
  Wang Shixian 0–1
  Cheng Shao-chieh 0–2
  Tai Tzu-ying 0–2
  Tracey Hallam 0–1
  Juliane Schenk 0–5
  Xu Huaiwen 0–1
  Yip Pui Yin 0–1
  Zhou Mi 0–1
  Saina Nehwal 0–3
  Eriko Hirose 3–2
  Minatsu Mitani 1–2
  Sayaka Sato 0–1
  Sayaka Takahashi 0–2
  Bae Youn-joo 0–2
  Sung Ji-hyun 1–3
  Porntip Buranaprasertsuk 0–2
  Ratchanok Intanon 1–2

References

External links 

 
 
 

1988 births
Living people
People from Bantul Regency
Sportspeople from Special Region of Yogyakarta
Indonesian female badminton players
Badminton players at the 2010 Asian Games
Asian Games bronze medalists for Indonesia
Asian Games medalists in badminton
Medalists at the 2010 Asian Games
Competitors at the 2013 Southeast Asian Games
Southeast Asian Games competitors for Indonesia
21st-century Indonesian women
20th-century Indonesian women